The 2006–07 season of the GNF 1 first division of Moroccan football.

Teams

 AS Salé
 FAR Rabat
 Difaa El Jadida
 CODM Meknès
 IR Tanger
 IZK Khemisset
 Hassania Agadir
 Jeunesse Massira
 Maghreb Fez
 Mouloudia Oujda
 Kawkab Marrakech
 Moghreb Athletic Tétouan
 OC Khouribga
 Olympique Safi
 Wydad Casablanca
 Raja de Casablanca

Final league table

External links
RSSSF overview

Botola seasons
Morroco
1